Ranger José Suárez (born August 26, 1995) is a Venezuelan professional baseball pitcher for the Philadelphia Phillies of Major League Baseball (MLB).

The Phillies signed Suárez, a native of Pie de Cuesta, as an international free agent in 2012. His first season in the Venezuelan Summer League (VSL) was cut short by a drug suspension, but he returned to pitch in the VSL for two more seasons. In 2014, after giving up only one walk for the duration of the season, he began to attract the attention of the Phillies organization, and he was moved to the Rookie League the following year. Suárez' stock continued to rise in 2016, when he pitched a no-hitter with the Williamsport Crosscutters. In 2017 and 2018, he continued to rise through the Phillies' farm system, spending time in  Double-A and Triple-A as a starting pitcher with a high strikeout rate.

Suárez made his major league debut in 2018, when the Phillies were in need of an additional starting pitcher. He returned to Triple-A at the start of the 2019 season but was a mainstay within the Phillies by the end of June. He was used as a relief pitcher for most of his appearances that season, but was in contention for a role in the starting rotation in 2020. Suárez ultimately missed most of the shortened season after contracting COVID-19 during training camp. He returned to the team in 2021 as a long reliever, pitching a stretch of successful middle innings in a depth-challenged roster, before joining the starting rotation at the trading deadline. Suárez served as the third starter during the 2022 Phillies season and was a key factor in the team winning the National League pennant.

Early life 
Suárez was born on August 26, 1995, in Pie de Cuesta, Venezuela. His father Ricardo worked as a farmer in Venezuela, while Suárez spent his childhood playing baseball and soccer. He spent most of his time in the outfield but began pitching at the age of 15.

Baseball career

Minor leagues 
He was sixteen years old when he made his professional baseball debut for the Venezuelan Summer League (VSL) Phillies, pitching in three games as the team's closer. In five innings pitched, Suárez recorded four strikeouts and recorded two saves. Suárez' season came to an abrupt end in July after he was found in violation of the Minor League Baseball (MiLB) drug program. Suárez and fellow pitcher Daniel Cordero tested positive for the anabolic steroid Stanozolol, and were both suspended for 50 games. He returned to the VSL the following year, posting a 3.18 earned run average with eight runs allowed and 13 strikeouts in 17 innings. He posted a 5–4 win–loss record that season, with a 1.56 ERA and 78 strikeouts, while leading the VSL in both innings pitched and strikeouts (78).

By , Suárez had been assigned to the Rookie League GCL Phillies. He pitched in only six games that season in the Gulf Coast League, as a left elbow strain cut his season short. In the  innings that he did pitch, Suárez posted a 3–0 record and a 0.65 ERA with 20 strikeouts and only four walks allowed. The next year, he was assigned to the Class A Short-Season Williamsport Crosscutters of the New York–Penn League (NYPL). On July 26, in the first game of a doubleheader against the Auburn Doubledays, Suárez pitched a seven-inning no-hitter and took Williamsport to a 4–0 victory. For the feat, he was named both the Phillies Minor League and the NYPL Pitcher of the Week for the week spanning July 25 to 31. Suárez finished the season with a 6–4 record and a 2.81 ERA, striking out 53 batters in  innings. That September, he was honored with the Rankin Johnson Pitcher of the Year Award, given to the Crosscutters' top pitcher of the season as decided by teammates and coaches.

Suárez began the  season with the Class A Lakewood BlueClaws. He had a strong start to the year, giving up only two runs in his first four starts and reaching a streak of 24 shutout innings. For his efforts, the Phillies named Suárez their Minor League Pitcher of the Month for April 2017. On June 27, he carried a perfect game into the eighth inning before giving up a single to Jarett Rindfleisch of the Greensboro Grasshoppers. Suárez was named to the South Atlantic League All-Star team, but Jordan Jess replaced him on the roster. This was because before the game, on July 4, Suárez was promoted to the Class A-Advanced Clearwater Threshers. He joined a rotation of top pitching prospects that also included JoJo Romero, Sixto Sanchez, and Franklyn Kilome. Between both minor league teams, Suárez posted an 8–6 record in 2017, with a 2.27 ERA and 128 strikeouts in  innings. At the end of the season, the Phillies added Suárez and three other pitching prospects to the 40-man roster, in order to protect them from the Rule 5 draft.

In 2018, Suárez was assigned to the Double-A Reading Fightin Phils as part of a starting rotation that also included Romero, Kilome, and Seranthony Dominguez. He was named the Eastern League Pitcher of the Week twice with Reading, once in April and once in June. At the end of June, he was promoted to the Triple-A Lehigh Valley IronPigs, where, after a difficult first start, he accumulated 65 strikeouts in 14 games. Between Reading and Lehigh, Suárez posted a 6–3 record in 2018, with a 2.75 ERA and 85 strikeouts in 21 games and  innings.

Philadelphia Phillies 

After a rain delay forced a doubleheader against the San Diego Padres, the Phillies were in need of an extra man in their starting rotation, and Suárez was called up to the major leagues on July 24, 2018. He debuted on July 26, allowing six hits and four runs in five innings, including a pair of two-run home runs from Eugenio Suarez and Tucker Barnhart. Suárez came away with the win, however, as the Phillies hit seven home runs for a 9–4 victory. He was the first left-handed starter to pitch for the Phillies since Adam Morgan in 2016. Suárez played four games with the Phillies in 2018, starting three, and posted a 1–1 record with a 5.40 ERA and 11 strikeouts in 15 innings.

Suárez returned to Lehigh in 2019 as MLB.com's No. 10 prospect in the Phillies organization. After two brief major-league call-ups in June, he received a final promotion to the Phillies on June 20. That July, he became the first Phillies pitcher since Michael Stutes in 2011 to record wins in three consecutive appearances. Despite playing 82 of his 94 minor league games as a starting pitcher, Suárez became a staple of the Phillies' bullpen as a left-handed reliever alongside Morgan and José Álvarez. He made 37 relief appearances for the Phillies in 2019, finishing eight games for them. Suárez posted a 6–1 record and a 3.14 ERA, with 42 strikeouts in  innings.

After his successful 2019 season, Suárez was expected to be a strong candidate for a position in the Phillies'  starting rotation. His upward trajectory, however, came to a halt shortly before opening day, when he tested positive for the COVID-19 virus. After spending four weeks quarantining in a hotel room in Clearwater, Florida, Suárez rejoined the roster for the final part of the season, which was shortened to 60 games due to the impacts of the pandemic. He began rehab assignments in Lehigh Valley in late August before being placed into a bullpen with recent acquisitions Brandon Workman, Heath Hembree, and David Hale. In only four innings with the Phillies, Suárez posted an ERA of 20.25, surrendering 10 hits and nine earned runs, including one home run, while striking out only one batter.

Once again, Suárez opened the 2021 season with Lehigh. He returned to the Phillies on May 27, called in to relieve Spencer Howard in the fifth inning of a game against the Miami Marlins. He took over on the mound with the bases loaded, and proceeded to pitch three shutout innings in what ultimately became a 3–2 win for the Phillies. After the 5–2 victory over the Washington Nationals, Phillies manager Joe Girardi told reporters that he intended to combine Howard and Suárez in future games. His role had shifted by July: Héctor Neris was removed as the Phillies' closer in June after four blown saves and an 8.22 ERA for the month, and José Alvarado lost the position when he walked 27 batters in 31 innings. Suárez was asked to close a 4–2 win over the San Diego Padres on July 3, picking up his first career save. He blew his first save two weeks later, giving up a two-run home run to Jesús Aguilar in the ninth inning of a game against the Miami Marlins, forcing the game into extra innings. At the MLB trading deadline, the Phillies acquired closer Ian Kennedy from the Texas Rangers; Suárez, in turn, was promoted to the starting rotation. Suárez threw his first career complete game, a 97 pitch four-hit 3-0 shutout or Maddux against the Pittsburgh Pirates on September 25, 2021. 

He pitched in 39 games for the Phillies in 2021, starting 12 and finishing 13, and posted an 8–5 record with a 1.36 ERA and 107 strikeouts in 106 innings. He held opposing left-handed batters to a .109 batting average and .129 slugging percentage, the lowest of all major league pitchers.

2022

In 2022 he was 10-7 with a 3.65 ERA in 29 starts over 155.1 innings. He held opposing left-handed batters to a .197 batting average and .303 slugging percentage.

In game five of the 2022 National League Championship series, Suárez helped to clinch the series win over the San Diego Padres. Suárez entered the game in the top of the ninth inning to replace David Robertson, who managed to strikeout his first batter and issued two walks afterwards. Suárez's first pitch was bunted by Trent Grisham to which Suárez fielded to throw out Grisham, allowing the runners to advance to second and third base.  With two outs, Suárez faced Austin Nola, who hit a fly ball on the first pitch thrown and was caught by Nick Castellanos, claiming a 4–3 victory over the Padres.

2023

On January 13, 2023, Suárez agreed to a one-year, $2.95 million contract with the Phillies for the 2023 season, avoiding salary arbitration.

Pitcher profile 
Suárez spent most of his professional baseball career as a starting pitcher before alternating through the bullpen in many roles such as a long reliever, set-up man and closer by the Phillies from 2019 to 2021. In the late 2021 season, however, the Phillies moved Suárez to the starting pitching rotation due to lack of depth and injuries in their rotation. Suárez' pitch repertoire varies based on how he is being used: as a starting pitcher, he prefers to use a slider, while, as a reliever, he utilizes a combination of a sinker and a changeup. Suárez' fastball averages  and contributes to a high strikeout rate.

Personal life 
Suárez is the first MLB player to be named "Ranger". While he was playing in the minor leagues, some of his teammates nicknamed him the "red Power Ranger". Suárez has two brothers named Raymer and Rosmer and a sister named Rangerlin. He told reporters that it is a family tradition to give every child a name beginning with the letter "R".

See also
 List of Major League Baseball players from Venezuela

References

External links

1995 births
Living people
Major League Baseball players from Venezuela
Venezuelan expatriate baseball players in the United States
Major League Baseball pitchers
Philadelphia Phillies players
Venezuelan Summer League Phillies players
Florida Complex League Phillies players
Williamsport Crosscutters players
Lakewood BlueClaws players
Clearwater Threshers players
Reading Fightin Phils players
Lehigh Valley IronPigs players